Turatia namibiella is a moth in the family Autostichidae. It was described by Georg Derra in 2011. It is found in Namibia.

References

Moths described in 2011
Turatia